Kechi may refer to:
 Kechi, Isfahan, Iran
 Kechi, Jabal, Iran
 Kechi, Kansas, United States

See also
 Kachi (disambiguation)